Kannadathi is an Indian television drama in the Kannada language that premiered on Colors Kannada on 27 January 2020 and ended on 03 February 2023. It stars Kiran Raj, Ranjani Raghavan, Sara Annaiah and Chitkala Biradar.

Summary 
Bhuvaneshwari (also known as Bhuvi), a village girl, Hasirupete, goes to Bengaluru to work as a temporary lecturer to pay off her family's debts, and expects her friend Varudhini (also called Varu) to help. Varu runs a company that performs wedding ceremonies, and meets Harsha, CEO of Mala Cafe, at his cousin Aadi's wedding immediately falling in love. Sania's (Aadi's fiancé) parents ask Rathnamala (Harsha's mother) who is the owner and founder of Mala School and Mala Cafe, a huge share in their property, to which she reluctantly agrees. After the wedding, Rathnamala leaves for Sigandhoor Devi Darshan on a bus that travels through her home village Hasirupete. Bhuvi, who returned to Hasirupete after she helped at Aadi's wedding, finds Rathnamala injured by a snake bite. Bhuvi takes Rathnamala to her home, and she is impressed by Bhuvi's hospitality and kindness, and they become close.

Rathnamala returns to Bengaluru and offers a Kannada lecturer post to Bhuvi without the latter's knowledge. She also helps Bhuvi find a house to rent. Bhuvi and Harsha encounter each other many times; Bhuvi looks after Harsha at her home when he is sick for a few days. Rathnamala's doctor tells her that she will soon die. Rathnamala wants Harsha to marry Bhuvi; the two share a mutual attraction, but Harsha has doubts about her idealism in his practical world while Bhuvi hides her feelings by claiming they are just friends. Varudhini's desire for Harsha increases. Later, on Varu's company logo reveal day, Varu expresses that her inspiration is Harsha and hugs him; Bhuvi notices and cries. After a few days and constant meetings, Harsha realises his love for Bhuvi but decides not to confess. Bhuvi has a dream in which her father is bitten by a snake. So she decides to return to Hasirupete to visit her father; Harsha and Bindu, Bhuvi's sister accompany her. Bhuvi's father died before she arrived, and she is compelled to perform the last rites of her father; she is taunted by her step-grandmother Mangallamma. After a few days Bhuvi, Harsha and Bindu return to Bengaluru after Bhuvi rejects a local man's marriage proposal given by Mangallamma. Bhuvi and Harsha release Varu from jail which the latter ended in to prevent Harsha from going to jail due to Sanya's evil plan. Varu's proximity to Harsha makes Bhuvi sad as she thinks they love each other. Many instances come where Harsha and Bhuvi get close to each other, spend time and protect each other, but never confess their love. A few days later, Sanya taunts Harsha about his love and Varu. Harsha is shocked to know that Varu likes him, and the next day with Bhuvi's help, he tells her that he does not like her and that he treats her just as a friend. After a few days, Harsha celebrates Bhuvi's birthday in a grand way and confesses his love. Bhuvi in a shock stays silent thinking of Varu. After a few days, Harsha and Bhuvi go for a trip where Harsha is kidnapped. In fear of losing him, Bhuvi also confesses her love to him.

Mangalamma falls sick and Bhuvi goes to Hasirupete to take care of the former. In course of time, Harsha and Rathnamala visit Hasirupete. They ask Mangalamma Bhuvi's hand in marriage. After some debate about her granddaughters' (Bindu and Preeti) future, Mangalamma accepts the proposal. Harsha buys the house which Bhuvi had intended to earlier and registers it in her name. The engagement takes place in Hasirupete in a village style. Sanya hires a supari killer and plans to kill Bhuvi. Bhuvi becomes a victim to this but survives with injuries when Varudhini helps her. Although Varu does not want to let go of her "hero", requests Bhuvi to let her be the wedding planner to which Bhuvi agrees. While planning for the wedding and its theme, Bhuvi then wants to marry in a "Kannada style " where all the ceremonies are explained in detail and the rituals are performed by knowing its importance. The wedding rituals commences. Varudhuni still hopes to marry Harsha.

On the wedding day, Varudhini threatens Bhuvi for Harsha and cuts her wrist. Bhuvi takes Varu to the hospital. Due to unavailability of the auspicious hour, Bhuvi and Harsha marry in the hospital in the presence of their families and Varudhini. Bhuvi is welcomed by all in Rathnamala's house except Sania and her father-in-law. Both constantly pick up fights with Harsha and Bhuvi in property matter, mock Bhuvi that she will soon be the owner of the whole property. One day, Rathnamala faints and enters into a coma, later dies. The whole family is shocked and in sorrow. But Sania and her father-in-law is worried about the property inheritance and their share in it. Bhuvi learns that Rathnamala in her will had mentioned that Bhuvi (Souparnika Nanjunda) would be the inheritor of Mala properties and is in a dilemma as she cannot transfer her power over the property to anybody for 5 more years. Bhuvi discovers the video of Sania trying to kill Rathnamala which was in Rathnamala's mobile phone and decides to teach Sania a lesson.

When Adi gets to know about Sania and her devious plan to destroy the Jaaji, he pushes her out of anger in the building. He later tries to kill himself by jumping off the building but is saved by Sania who apologies him and Bhuvi. Varudhini tells Harsha that she loves him and wants to marry him despite he is already married to Harsha. Harsha tells her that he is only for Bhuvi. 

When the heritage Coffee is inaugurated, Bhuvi is thrilled to see the project in the name of late Ammamma. While Sania is happy with the success, Harsha can't believe Sania has changed. Varudhini creates a ruckus to marry Harsha, but Bhuvi triggers her and explains how Varu loves Harshit. Varu changes her decision and marries Harshit. Harsha and Bhuvi spend some time, sipping coffee talking about the Heritage Coffee Shop and Ammamma's dreams. Ammamma blesses them both in her divine state. The story ends with Harsha and Bhuvi on a table, filled with joy.

Cast

Main 
 Ranjani Raghavan as Bhuvaneshwari (Bhuvi) / Sowparnika
 Kiran Raj as Harsha Kumar (Harsha)
 Sara Annaiah as Varudhini (Varu)
 Chitkala Biradar as Rathnamala

Recurring 
 Ramola / Arohi Naina as Saniya
 Rakshith / Vijay Siddaraj as Adithya (Adi)
 Vijay Krishna / Hemanth Kumar as Dr. Dev
 Deepashree as Dr. Tapsi
 K Swamy as Sudharshan
 Sameksha as Prathima
 Amrutha Murthy as Suchitra (Suchi)
 Bhavish Padmajaya as Vikranth
 Mohira Acharya as Bindhu
 R. T. Rama as Mangalamma (Ajji)
 Amogha as Preethi
 Hemavathi as Sahana
 Unknown as Nanjunda
 Soumya Bhat as Aashitha
 Divya Gopal as Harini
 Malini HM as Varalakshmi
 Vinay / Vishnu Narayan as Lawyer Karthik
 Asha Gowda as Sharadha

Cameo appearances 
 Bhavana
 Manvita Kamath
 Ananya Bhat
 Dhanush Gowda as Vijays
 Jaidev Mohan as Purushottham Hadagali
 Kavya Mahadev as Ahalya Rajguru
 Snehith Gowda as Pranam Rajguru
 Yashwanth as Charan
 Roopika as Deepika
 Kaveri Bagalakote as Seema
 Rithvik Krupakar as Ramachari

Production 
Due to the COVID-19 pandemic in May 2021, shooting started in Ramoji Film City, Hyderabad, for a few episodes.

Awards and nominations

Adaptations

References 

2020 Indian television series debuts
Colors Kannada original programming
Kannada-language television shows